Riggins Lake is a lake in Berrien County, in the U.S. state of Michigan.

Riggins Lake has the name of David Riggins, a pioneer who settled at the lake in 1834.

References

Lakes of Berrien County, Michigan